The Rhodovibrionaceae are a family of bacteria from the order Rhodospirillales.

References

Rhodospirillales
Bacteria families